Laura Petrutytė (born 10 August 1976) is a Lithuanian former competitive swimmer.

Career 

Petrutytė competed at the 1994 World Aquatics Championships and set a personal best time of 26.55 in the 50 m freestyle. She set national records in the 50 m freestyle in 1994 (which stood until 2011) and the 1500 m freestyle. At the 1996 Summer Olympic Games Petrutytė finished 16th in the women's 50 metre freestyle with a new national record time of 26.13 and 41st in the women's 200 metre freestyle. Petrutytė attended Florida Atlantic University and took part in the 1997 NCAA Division I Women's Swimming and Diving Championships.

References

1976 births
Living people
Lithuanian female freestyle swimmers
Olympic swimmers of Lithuania
Swimmers at the 1996 Summer Olympics
Florida Atlantic University alumni